Heinz D. Kurz (born 29 March 1946) is professor of economics at the University of Graz.

Selected publications
 with Neri Salvadori as editor: The Elgar Companion to David Ricardo. Edward Elgar, Cheltenham, England 2015, . 
 Geschichte des ökonomischen Denkens, Beck, München 2013, .
 with Richard Sturn: Die größten Ökonomen. Adam Swithh. UTB, Stuttgart 2012, .
 with Richard Sturn: Schumpeter für jedermann. Von der Rastlosigkeit des Kapitalismus. Frankfurter Allgemeine Buchverlag, Frankfurt am Main 2012, .
 as editor: Klassiker des ökonomischen Denkens. Band 1, Verlag C. H. Beck, München 2008,  und Band 2, München 2009, .
 as editor: David Ricardo: Über die Grundsätze der politischen Ökonomie und der Besteuerung. Verlag Metropolis, 2006, .
 with Neri Salvadori: Theory of Production: A Long-Period Analysis. Cambridge University Press, Cambridge 1997, .

References

Academic staff of the University of Graz
Austrian economists
1946 births
Living people
Historians of economic thought